Hendrik Jacobus van Wyk (born 2 March 1992) is a South African rugby union player, currently playing with the Free State Cheetahs of the Currie Cup. His regular position is prop.

Career
He played for them in the 2011 Under-19 Provincial Championship and 2012 Under-21 Provincial Championship competitions and was a regular starter throughout both competitions.

In 2013, Van Wyk signed a contract extension to keep him at the  until 2015. He joined Japanese Top Kyūshū League side Munakata Sanix Blues before the 2015–2016 season.

Van Wyk returned to the  during the 2016 Super Rugby season, signing a contract until May 2016.

References

South African rugby union players
Living people
1992 births
Blue Bulls players
Bulls (rugby union) players
Munakata Sanix Blues players
South African expatriate rugby union players
South African expatriate sportspeople in Japan
Expatriate rugby union players in Japan
People from Nigel, Gauteng
Rugby union props
Sunwolves players
Lions (United Rugby Championship) players
Golden Lions players
Cheetahs (rugby union) players
NTT DoCoMo Red Hurricanes Osaka players
Free State Cheetahs players
San Diego Legion players
Rugby union players from Gauteng